Robots of Stanisław Lem are best known from writer's series Fables for Robots (1964), written in the grotesque form of folk fairy tales, set in the universe populated by robots. In this universe there are robot kings, robot peasants, robot knights, robot scientists; a robot damsel in distress is pestered by a robot dragon, robot dogs have robot fleas, etc. The collection The Cyberiad (1965) belongs to the same grotesque cross-genre of fairy tale and science fiction. Its main protagonists are robots-"constructors" Trurl and Klapaucius, who are something of both sorcerers and engineers.

Robots of different kind  are major characters in several stories from Lem's Tales of Pirx the Pilot cycle, as well as in some occasional stories, such as The Mask. 

An ultimate evolution of military robotics is described in the novel The Invincible, where a human crew is defeated by a swarm of microrobots  evolved by natural selection in the course of wars waged by robots. The idea was pursued by Lem further  in his fictitious review "Weapon Systems of the Twenty First Century or The Upside-down Evolution".

List of Lem's robot stories 
"The Hunt" (1950s Stanisław Lem short story)
"Faithful Robot", (1961), a  comedy/mystery/drama science fiction TV play
In the 1963 short story "Tragedia pralnicza" ("Washer Tragedy") from the memoirs of Ijon Tichy (Ze wspomnień Ijona Tichego), a rat race of the competition among washing machine manufacturers, Nuddlegg and Snodgrass corporations construct progressively smarter washer robots, which gradually acquire wider and wider legal rights as intelligent entities,  which leads to all kinds of legal perplexities.

The Invincible (1964)
 "The Sanatorium of Dr. Vliperdius" ["Zakład doktora Vliperdiusa"] (1964, translated into English in the collection Mortal Engines), about a mental asylum for robots
 A fabular universe of robots
Fables for Robots (1964)
The Cyberiad (1965)
"The Mask"
From the Tales of Pirx the Pilot:
"The Accident"
"The Inquest"; for plot summary, see  Inquest of Pilot Pirx, a 1978 film
"Terminus"
"The Hunt" (different from the 1950s story)

In popular culture
A mural in Kraków depicts a typical grotesque fabular robot, with a quotation from Dialogs: "Eventually the humans will dwarf down to the level of brainless servants of iron geniuses and may be even start to worship them as Gods".  The mural was created by  Filip Kużniarz in 2012. 

An elaborate interactive robot-themed Google Doodle inspired by The Cyberiad was created for the 60th anniversary of Lem's first published book: The Astronauts.

See also
Lem also wrote about intelligent machines other than robots 
Golem XIV, a lecture course given by a superintelligent computer
 Summa Technologiae (1964), a book-length essay contains Chapter 4: "Intellectronics", a term coined by Lem to speculate on the field that is known today as artificial intelligence, in lieu of the term "cybernetics" banned in the Soviet Bloc.

References

Further reading
Jo Alyson Parker, "Gendering the Robot: Stanislaw Lem’s 'The Mask' ", Science Fiction Studies,  No. 57, Volume 19, Part 2, July 1992
John Rothfork, "The Ghost in the Machine: The Concept of Self in  Stanislaw Lem's Mortal Engines", Liberal and Fine Arts Review, vol. 4, no.1,  1984, pp. 1-18

Fictional humanoid robots
Stanisław Lem fictional characters